Cybergenic Ranger: Secret of the Seventh Planet is a computer game developed by Symtus in 1990 for MS-DOS.

Plot
In Cybergenic Ranger: Secret of the Seventh Planet, the player was launched out of a spacecraft by his parents to save him from certain death by renegade robots, and saved when someone gave him cybergenic enhancements. The character thus becomes the Cybergenic Ranger, to battle the renegade robots that killed his parents. The player's ship starts off with no weaponry at all, requiring the player to search planets to find items that will enable the ship to become more powerful.

Reception
Computer Gaming World called Cybergenic Ranger "an IBM game in Sega clothing", inspired by Altered Beast and many other science-fiction stories and arcade games. Although stating that "compared to a good Sega game" it "sometimes has a second-rate feel", the magazine recommended Cybergenic Ranger to "the dedicated MS-DOS gamer who wants a solid action fix". In 1991, Dragon gave the game 1 out of 5 stars. COMPUTE! praised the graphics, calling them "lovingly detailed" with a "true arcade 3-D effect."

References

External links
Cybergenic Ranger: Secret of the Seventh Planet at MobyGames

1990 video games
DOS games
DOS-only games
Run and gun games
Side-scrolling video games
Video games developed in the United States